Adrienne Bennett (born 1 June 1949) is a British sports shooter. She competed in the women's 25 metre pistol event at the 1984 Summer Olympics.

References

1949 births
Living people
British female sport shooters
Olympic shooters of Great Britain
Shooters at the 1984 Summer Olympics
Sportspeople from Liverpool